Héctor Martín Garay (born 12 June 1999) is an Argentine football player who plays as right winger or right-back for Atlético Tucumán, on loan from Estudiantes (BA).

Career
Garay's senior career started with Primera B Metropolitana team Estudiantes at the age of eighteen. He made his debut on 30 June 2017 during a league draw away from home against Colegiales, having replaced Federico Pellegrino off the bench with eighteen minutes remaining. His first start came in the succeeding season, 2017–18, in a goalless home draw with Acassuso on 5 December, while his first senior goal occurred in the final game of the campaign against UAI Urquiza on 15 May 2018. 2018–19 saw Estudiantes win promotion to Primera B Nacional, with Garay scoring once across twenty-four fixtures for the club.

Garay scored twice, versus Barracas Central and Temperley respectively, in his first six appearances at second tier level. After twenty-five matches and one more goal across two seasons in Primera Nacional, Garay departed on loan in February 2021 to Primera División side Patronato; penning terms until the succeeding December. Before leaving, the midfielder renewed his contract until the end of 2023 with El Pincha. He debuted in a 1–0 defeat away to Defensa y Justicia on 26 February.

Career statistics
.

Notes

References

External links

1999 births
Living people
Sportspeople from Córdoba Province, Argentina
Argentine footballers
Association football midfielders
Primera B Metropolitana players
Primera Nacional players
Argentine Primera División players
Estudiantes de Buenos Aires footballers
Club Atlético Patronato footballers
Atlético Tucumán footballers